Protarchus is a genus of parasitoid wasps belonging to the family Ichneumonidae.

The species of this genus are found in Europe and Northern America.

Species:
 Protarchus antiquus Statz, 1936 
 Protarchus atrofacies Leblanc, 1999

References

Ichneumonidae
Ichneumonidae genera